Uttamsingh Pawar was a member of the 11th Lok Sabha & 12th Lok Sabha of India. He represented the Jalna constituency of Maharashtra and was a member of the Bharatiya Janata Party as well as Janata Party .

References

India MPs 1996–1997
India MPs 1998–1999
Marathi politicians
Bharatiya Janata Party politicians from Maharashtra
Lok Sabha members from Maharashtra
People from Jalna, Maharashtra
Janata Party politicians
Indian National Congress politicians